This page provides a list of Telugu-language films produced in the year 2012.

Box office

Box office releases

January–June

July–December

Dubbed films

References 

2012
Telugu
Telugu